Chinese Manichaeism, also known as Monijiao or Mingjiao ( or 'bright religion'), is the form of Manichaeism transmitted to, and currently practiced in, China. It rose to prominence during the Tang dynasty and, despite frequent persecutions, has continued long after the other forms of Manichaeism were eradicated in the West. The most complete set of surviving Manichaean writings were written in Chinese sometime before the 9th century and were found in the Mogao Caves among the Dunhuang manuscripts.

Chinese Manichaeism represents a set of teachings with the purpose of inducing awakening, and it is a dualistic religion that believes in the eternal fight between the principles of good/light and evil/darkness, the former being represented by a God known as Shangdi,   "Radiant Lord" or Zhēnshén 真神 "True God". Salvation is delivered by the Living Spirit of God, of whom there have been many manifestations in human form, including Mani.

History

Due to how adaptable the teachings and beliefs of Manichaeism are, they were able to spread across a vast expanse of different cultures, from the Roman Empire to the west and China to the east. The religion arrived alongside Christianity through the various south-eastern Chinese seaports and overland Silk Road trade routes from the western desert regions.

Sources state that Manichaeism was first brought into China in the year 694, but this may have happened much earlier. Since its introduction, Manichaeism has been deeply sinicised in its style, adapting to the Chinese cultural context.

Tang dynasty
Manichaeism was introduced into China during the Tang dynasty through Central Asian communities and was regarded as an improper form of Buddhism by the Tang authorities. Although religions of the Western peoples (including those of Bactria and Sogdia) were not outlawed, they were prohibited from spreading among the native Chinese population.

According to the Chinese Manichaeans of the Ming Dynasty, their religion entered the country through Mōzak during the reign of the Emperor Gaozong of Tang (650–683). The pupil of Mōzak, bishop Mihr-Ohrmazd, followed his leader into China and was granted an audience with Wu Zetian (who held de facto power in the Tang dynasty between 684 and 690, and ruled as emperor of the Wu Zhou dynasty from 690 to 705) where, according to later Buddhist sources, he presented the Shabuhragan which ended up becoming the most popular text of the country's Manichaeans. In 731, the Emperor Xuanzong asked a Manichaean to summarize their foreign religious doctrines, and the result was a text known as the Compendium of the Teachings of Mani, the Awakened One of Light. The text interprets the prophet Mani as an incarnation of Laozi (although Manichaeans clashed with the local Chinese Buddhists, they maintained good relations with their Taoist neighbors); a version of the Taoist Huahujing from the 8th century shares the same perspective as the Compendium, stating that Laozi reincarnated among the Western barbarian peoples as the prophet Mani.

The north-western Uyghur Khaganate learned of Manichaeism from Sogdian foreigners. After the Khagan Bögü Qaghan (759–780) held a three-day discussion with members of the Manichaean clergy, he converted to the religion in 763. Due to the peace between the Uyghurs and Han populations during this time, the Tang government relaxed its restraints on Manichaeism, allowing it to flourish with monasteries built by the Uyghurs in places such as Shaoxing, Yangzhou, Nanjing, and Jingzhou, with the first being built in 768.

Persecution

The years of prosperity for Manichaeism came to an end in the wake of the Kyrgyz's defeat of the Uyghur Khaganate in 840 and a rising resentment for non-Chinese foreigners. Manichaeism was officially banned and persecuted through the suppression of non-Chinese religions started by the Emperor Wuzong of Tang in 843. During that year, the Tang Dynasty government confiscated all of the property belonging to the Manichaean monasteries, destroyed the temples, burnt their scriptures, laicized or killed the clergy, and specifically executed seventy Manichaean nuns in Chang'an.

Instead of their traditional clothing, the Manichaean priests were ordered to wear the hanfu, as the typical attire of Manichaeism was deemed un-Chinese. In some cases, the Manichaeans were ordered by Tang authorities to dress like Buddhist monks and, also since Manichaean priests were known for their long hair, they were forced to have their heads shaven. Over half of the Manichaean population is estimated to have been killed due to Emperor Wuzong's Great Anti-Buddhist Persecution. Two years after the persecution began, a total ban on foreign relations caused Manichaeism to hide underground, from which it has never regained its past prominence.

Song and Yuan dynasties

Though they participated in rebellions against the government during the Song dynasty, the Chinese Manichaeans were continually stamped down by the successive Chinese dynasties, with the Confucian authorities of the Song era disregarding the local Manichaeans as “vegetarian demon-worshippers" (Chinese: 吃菜事魔). Their fortunes changed during the Mongol-led Yuan dynasty, where the religion enjoyed a stable existence while the Sakya sect of Tibetan Buddhism served as the ‘’de facto’’ state religion of the Yuan. Two elaborate silk paintings survive from this era: Manichaean Diagram of the Universe and Sermon on Mani's Teaching of Salvation. These works provide an insight into Yuan-era cosmology of Chinese Manichaeism.

Further Syncretization

Manichaeism survived among the population and had a profound influence on the tradition of the Chinese salvationist religions, integrating with the Maitreyan beliefs such as the White Lotus Sect.

Due to the rise of the Ming dynasty, the name for Manichaeism, Mingjiao, was seen as offensive to the Emperor, so it received particular persecution.

During and after the 14th century, some Chinese Manichaeans involved themselves with the Pure Land school of Mahayana Buddhism in southern China. Those Manichaeans practiced their rituals so closely alongside the Mahayana Buddhists that over the years the two sects became indistinguishable. The Cao'an temple in Fujian stands as an example this synthesis, as a statue of the "Buddha of Light" is thought to be a representation of the prophet Mani.

Present-day

In modern China, Manichaean groups are still active in southern provinces, especially in Quanzhou and the rest of Fujian and around the Cao'an, the most noted Manichaean temple that has survived until today.

Qianku Manicheans 

Qianku was an ancient center of Manichaeism and is quite close to Cao'an, one of the last surviving temples, and to this day continues to have traditions on the 1st and 15th days of the lunar month where many locals do the following 

 Eat vegetarian on those days. The dishes served are mainly pickles, green vegetables, shiitake mushrooms, fungus, day lily, etc. Any miscellaneous food including animal oils and so on.
 Burning incense and worshipping on those days
 Avoiding using feces or urine for fertilizer on those days. In the 1980s-1990s the peasants placed the urine bucket on the side of the road to make it convenient for passers-by. If it is almost full, it must be disposed of early. Especially on the day before the first and fifteenth day of the new year, the inspection must be carried out. If it is a little full, it must be processed in advance, and rainy days are no exception.
 People avoid travel on these days; however, this norm is fading
 People often choose these days as auspicious days to plan events, doctor's appointments, opening businesses, and marrying. This approach is costly and time-consuming. In the past, some people in the Qianku area used to have a catchphrase: "You don't need to turn over the books on the first and fifteenth day of the middle school."
There is a custom of fishermen eating three bites of white rice a day. These three bites of white rice represent vegetarian meals for three meals a day. This is similar to the welcoming activity of the Manichaeans worshipping Lin Peng in Xiapu, where farmers used three small cups of white rice to worship the gods.

There is also the custom of wearing plain white clothes to honor the dead among the people in the Qianku area. This is the relic of the Manichaean believers' custom of white clothes and white crowns.

There is also a strong veneration of the Sun and the Moon, which are often called the Sunlight Buddha and Moonlight Buddha by locals

Texts 

Although there is no shortage of documentation of Manichaeism in southern China, doctrinal and liturgical writings remain rare. Nearly all present knowledge of the beliefs and teachings of Chinese Manichaeism (including its presence in the Tarim Basin region) draws from three texts compiled before the end of the 9th century: the Traité, the Hymnscroll, and the Compendium.

Besides a few absent opening lines, the Traité (Chinese: Moni jiao cao jing, lit. "fragmentary Manichean scripture") is in excellent condition and corresponds with Manichaean texts found in other languages. Within the  Traité are discourses attributed to Mani in response to questions from a disciple (named "A-to" or "Addā") on the nature of Manichaean cosmogony and ethics. The first discourse primarily concerns the creation of the universe via the salvation of primal man by the powers of light, a subsequent attack by the prince of darkness, and the eventual triumph of light over the darkness. Themes such as the symbol of trees and the enumeration of nights and days are found in other western Manichaean texts, namely those written in Coptic. More precise parallels can be drawn between the fragments of Turkish-Manichaean texts. In 1983, Werner Sundermann detailed how twenty-two Parthian manuscripts served as the original compositions of the texts, which were subsequently translated into Turkish and Sogdian, and then one of those Central Asian translations served as the basis for the Chinese language versions.

The Hymnscroll (Chinese:Moni jiao xia-bu zan, lit. "the lower (second?) section of the Manichean hymns") consists of thirty hymns that were likely directly translated from Parthian into the Chinese language, as several of the hymns are phonetic transcriptions of the original Parthian hymns, unintelligible to the common Chinese reader. The scroll finishes with an appeal for blessing. The text indicates that it was translated and compiled in Turfan. The Compendium (Chinese: Moni guang-fu jiao-fa yi-lüe, lit. "outline of the teachings and rules of Mani, Buddha of Light") begins with an account of Mani's birth that is directly based on the life of the Buddha and then provides a summarization of Manichaean doctrines. The text opens with a paragraph that explains how the text was ordered by the Tang dynasty on July 16, 731, and in a later passage mentions how Mani was a reincarnation of Lao-tzu.

Artwork 

Painting is a Manichaean tradition that traces its roots back to Mani himself (Arzhang), who elevated art-making to the esteem of the divine spirit, believed that meditating on beauty brought one closer to god, and ultimately saw the practicality of pictures as a transcultural method of teaching.
 Just as the pristine-condition Manichaean texts come from Chinese Manichaeism, so, too, do the remaining examples of Manichaean artwork, in the forms of fragments and full hanging-scrolls.

See also 

 Cao'an
 Ming Cult
 Chinese Buddhism
 Chinese folk religion
 Chinese ritual mastery traditions
 Chinese salvationist religions
 Great Anti-Buddhist Persecution
 Manichaean Diagram of the Universe
 Manichaean Painting of the Buddha Jesus
 Sermon on Mani's Teaching of Salvation

References

Citations

Sources

External links 
 Chinese Manichaeism

 
Religion in China